Ahhotep II was an ancient Egyptian queen, and likely the Great Royal Wife of Pharaoh Kamose.

Different Ahhoteps
The naming / numbering by Egyptologists of the queens named Ahhotep has changed during the years.

During the late nineteenth century, Egyptologists thought that Ahhotep I was the wife of Seqenenre Tao. The coffins of Deir el-Bahari and Dra' Abu el-Naga' were both thought by some experts to be hers. Also, Ahhotep II was thought to be the wife of Amenhotep I as the coffin from the Deir el-Bahari cache was considered to belong to a queen called Ahhotep II.

During the 1970s, it was noted that the Deir el-Bahari coffin bears the title King's Mother yet Amenhotep I had no son. Therefore, the title must refer to the mother of Ahmose I. In 1982, Robins suggested that Ahhotep I was the occupant of the gilded coffin from Dra' Abu el-Naga'.  Ahhotep II is the queen mentioned on the Deir el-Bahari coffin and Ahhotep III is the Queen mentioned on the statue of a prince Ahmose.

Following Dodson and Hilton (2004), it is now considered that Ahhotep I was the wife of Seqenenre Tao and the mother of Ahmose I. Ahhotep II is now regarded as the queen identified from the gilded coffin found at Dra' Abu el-Naga' and, therefore, possibly a wife of Kamose. It is no longer considered that there was a queen called Ahhotep III.

This interpretation by Dodson and Hilton has been used in this article.

Family
Ahhotep II is thought to be the wife of Kamose and possibly the mother of Queen Ahmose-Sitkamose. It is possible that Ahhotep II is identical to a queen known as Ahhotep I. If so, she may have been married to Seqenenre Tao instead.

The title of King's Mother is only found on the coffin from Deir el Bahari and not on the funerary equipment from Dra' Abu el-Naga'. It could be argued that Ahhotep II was a royal wife but never the mother of a pharaoh, and hence not the same person as Ahhotep I.

Burial

Ahhotep II was buried in Dra' Abu el-Naga' and rediscovered in 1858 by workmen employed by Auguste Mariette. The tomb contained her mummy (destroyed in 1859) and gold and silver jewelry. An inscribed ceremonial axe blade made of copper, gold, electrum and wood was decorated with a Minoan style griffin. Three golden flies were included and were awards usually given to people who served and acquitted themselves well in the army. A few items bore the name of Kamose, but more were inscribed with the name of Ahmose I.

The Dra' Abu el-Naga' coffin and the items associated with it all have inscriptions using an early form of the Iah glyph. The representation of the hieroglyph changed between years 18 and 22 of Ahmose I. The use of the early form of Iah suggests that Queen Ahhotep II died sometime before year 20 of Ahmose I. This suggests that this queen is not Ahhotep, mother of Ahmose, because that queen appears on a stela dated to Amenhotep I and possibly survived into the reign of Thutmose I.

Alternative theory
An alternative interpretation has been developed by Ann Macy Roth. In this interpretation, the pharaoh Seqenenre Tao had three queen consorts:
 Ahhotep I, who was the mother of a prince named Ahmose (not the future pharaoh) and several princesses named Ahmes.
 Sitdjehuti, who was the mother of a princess named Ahmes.
 Tetisheri, who was the mother of Kamose, Ahhotep II and Ahmose-Henuttamehu.

Kamose married his sister Ahhotep II and were then the parents of Ahmose I, Ahmose-Nefertari and Ahmose-Sitkamose.

References

Queens consort of the Seventeenth Dynasty of Egypt
16th-century BC women